Mehdi Khodabakhshi (born April 21, 1991 in Tonekabon, Iran) is an Iranian-born Serbian Taekwondo practitioner. He was two times world champion, in 2014 and in 2022.

Career 
He represented Iran until 2019 when he switched allegiance by representing Serbia through naturalisation. He has been involved in the sport for more than 15 years. He has beaten several Taekwondo notables such as Aaron Cook and Steven Lopez and was the world champion. Also he additionally won the gold medal in the welterweight division in the 2014 Asian Games in Incheon. He is a participant of the 2016 Rio Olympics, but lost in the 1/04-Final against the Iranian born Azeri Milad Beigi He won his second world title in 2022 World Taekwondo Championships, first time representing Serbia.

References

External links

 

Iranian male taekwondo practitioners
Serbian male taekwondo practitioners
1991 births
Living people
Asian Games gold medalists for Iran
Asian Games medalists in taekwondo
Taekwondo practitioners at the 2014 Asian Games
Taekwondo practitioners at the 2016 Summer Olympics
Medalists at the 2014 Asian Games
Taekwondo practitioners at the 2018 Asian Games
Olympic taekwondo practitioners of Iran
World Taekwondo Championships medalists
Asian Taekwondo Championships medalists
Islamic Solidarity Games competitors for Iran
Islamic Solidarity Games medalists in taekwondo
People from Tonekabon
Sportspeople from Mazandaran province